The  Iowa Barnstormers season was the team's seventeenth season as a professional indoor football franchise and third in the Indoor Football League (IFL). One of ten teams that competed in the IFL for the 2017 season, the Barnstormers were members of the United Conference.

Led by first-year head coach Dixie Wooten, the Barnstormers played their home games at the Wells Fargo Arena in the Des Moines, Iowa.

Staff

Schedule
Key:

Pre-season

Regular season

All start times are local time

Standings

Postseason

Roster

References

External links
 Iowa Barnstormers official statistics

Iowa Barnstormers seasons
Iowa Barnstormers
Iowa Barnstormers